The Hampshire and Hampden Canal was the Massachusetts segment of an  canal that once connected New Haven, Connecticut, to the Connecticut River north of Northampton, Massachusetts.  Its Connecticut segment was called the Farmington Canal.

The canal dates to 1821 when New Haven businessmen began to raise capital and investigate a possible canal route from their harbor to central Massachusetts, and on to Barnet, Vermont, and Canada beyond. In this original vision, the canal would pass through Farmington, Connecticut, to the border at Southwick, Massachusetts, then join the Connecticut River near Northampton, and from there continue to the St. Lawrence River through Lake Memphremagog and the valley of the St. Francis River. Two side canals were also envisioned: one running from Farmington through Unionville, Connecticut, to Colebrook, Connecticut; the other linking to the Erie Canal via the Hudson River or the proposed (but never built) Boston and Albany Canal.

Benjamin Wright, the Erie Canal's chief engineer, was hired to conduct a preliminary survey from New Haven to Southwick, Massachusetts. In 1822 he gave a positive report: "The terrain is favorably formed for a great work of this kind and a canal may be formed for considerable less expense per mile, than the cost of canals now in the making in the state of New York." That same year, the Connecticut legislature granted a charter to the Farmington Canal Company, and on February 4, 1823, Massachusetts granted its corresponding charter to the Hampshire & Hampden Canal Company. After this second charter was granted, work began.

Ground-breaking ceremonies took place on July 4, 1825, at the Massachusetts–Connecticut border. However, when Connecticut Governor Oliver Wolcott, Jr. employed the ceremonial shovel, it broke in his hands, and this was perhaps emblematic of the canal companies' subsequent fate, as both were substantially under-capitalized and severe financial difficulties plagued their project throughout its existence. Despite these woes, however, construction proceeded with pick and shovel, and by 1828 the canal was open for business from New Haven to Farmington, including its major aqueduct over the Farmington River. By 1835 the complete route to Northampton was finished and operating.

Twenty-eight locks were constructed to navigate the  rise in elevation between New Haven and Granby. A further  of branch canal were constructed to Unionville, later turned into a feeder for the main canal.

Financial strains continued, however, and the two canal companies merged to form the New Haven & Northampton Canal Company. A major threat to the canal came in 1838 with the opening of the New Haven Railroad between New Haven and Meriden, Connecticut. Although the canal company took out further loans in the 1840s to improve its efficiency, its stockholders finally petitioned the General Assembly for authority to build a railroad on their canal bed. A charter was granted, and construction commenced in January 1847. The canal closed later that year, and by 1848 trains were running from New Haven to Plainville along the canal's right of way. The company's name remained unchanged, and it kept many of the same investors. It eventually merged with the New York, New Haven and Hartford Railroad in 1887.

See also
 Farmington Canal
 Farmington Canal Trail
 Lockville Historic District, which has a canal prism and lock remnant, in Southampton, Massachusetts
 New Haven and Northampton Company

References 
 "The Farmington Canal 1822–1847: An Attempt at Internal Improvement"—Curriculum Unit 81.ch.04, Yale-New Haven Teachers Institute
 DeWitt Clinton's Observations relative to the Hampshire and Hampden Canals
 Camposeo, James Mark, "The History of the Canal System between New Haven and Northampton, 1822–1849", Historical Journal of Western Massachusetts, vol. 6, no. 1 (Fall 1977).
 Ralf, A. J., An Account of the Farmington Canal Company; of the Hampshire and Hamden Canal Company; and of the New Haven and Northampton Company, New Haven: Thomas J. Stafford, 1850.

Bodies of water of Hampden County, Massachusetts
Bodies of water of Hampshire County, Massachusetts
Canals in Massachusetts
Canals opened in 1828
Non-railway predecessors of railway companies
Predecessors of the New York, New Haven and Hartford Railroad
Transportation buildings and structures in Hampden County, Massachusetts
Transportation buildings and structures in Hampshire County, Massachusetts